Barbara Katherine Cegavske (née Jewson; born August 27, 1951) is an American businesswoman and politician, who is the former Secretary of State of Nevada from 2015 to 2023. She was a Republican member of the Nevada Senate, representing Clark County District 8 (map) from 2002 to 2014. Previously, she served in the Nevada Assembly from 1996 to 2001. According to her legislative biography, she was educated at Mayo High School in Rochester, Minnesota, and at Clark County Community College (now known as the College of Southern Nevada) in Las Vegas. With her husband, Tim, she was a 7-11 convenience store franchisee for thirteen years before seeking political office.

Cegavske is a member of the American Legislative Exchange Council (ALEC), serving as Nevada state leader in 2012.

Cegavske successfully ran for the office of Secretary of State of Nevada in 2014, defeating Democratic state treasurer Kate Marshall. Cegavske supports voter ID laws and opposes same-day voter registration. She was reelected in 2018, very narrowly defeating Democrat Nelson Araujo. With the defeat of several fellow Republicans in that election, Cegavske became the only member of her party holding statewide elected office in Nevada.

After Joe Biden won the 2020 election and Donald Trump lost while refusing to concede, Cegavske was censured by the Nevada Republican Party for not having conducted an investigation into allegations of fraud and for "dismissive public statements regarding election integrity concerns."

Electoral history
Cegavske was elected in 1996 to the Nevada Assembly from the Clark County 5th District.

References

External links
 
 Nevada State Legislature – Senator Barbara Cegavske –official government website
 
 Project Vote Smart – Senator Barbara Cegavske (NV) profile
 Follow the Money – Barbara Cegavske
 2006 2004 2002 2000 1998 1996 campaign contributions

1951 births
20th-century American businesspeople
20th-century American businesswomen
20th-century American politicians
20th-century American women politicians
21st-century American politicians
21st-century American women politicians
College of Southern Nevada alumni
Living people
Republican Party members of the Nevada Assembly
Methodists from Nevada
Republican Party Nevada state senators
People from Faribault, Minnesota
Politicians from Carson City, Nevada
Politicians from Las Vegas
Secretaries of State of Nevada
Women state legislators in Nevada